Abseudrapa is a genus of moths of the family Noctuidae.

Species
Abseudrapa metaphaeria (Walker, 1869)

References
Natural History Museum Lepidoptera genus database

Calpinae
Noctuoidea genera